The Tamarack River is a river in Aitkin and Carlton counties, in the U.S. state of Minnesota. The river flows into the Prairie River, which then flows into the Big Sandy Lake.

Tamarack River was named from growth of tamarack along its banks.

References

See also
List of rivers of Minnesota
Tamarack River (disambiguation)

Rivers of Aitkin County, Minnesota
Rivers of Carlton County, Minnesota
Rivers of Minnesota